Radu Traian Leonte (born 16 June 1991) is a Romanian professional footballer who plays as a midfielder for Liga II side FC Brașov. In his career, Leonte also played for teams such as Forex Brașov, FCM Baia Mare, Olimpic Cetate Râșnov or Corona Brașov.

Honours
Forex Brașov
Liga IV: 2010–11

Corona Brașov
Liga II: 2012–13
Liga III: 2011–12, 2020–21
Liga IV: 2019–20

Baia Mare
Liga III: 2014–15

References

External links
 
 
 Radu Leonte at frf-ajf.ro

1991 births
Living people
Sportspeople from Brașov
Romanian footballers
Association football midfielders
Liga I players
Liga II players
Liga III players
CSM Corona Brașov footballers
CS Minaur Baia Mare (football) players
FC Brașov (2021) players